Stagmomantis limbata, common name bordered mantis, bosque mantis, Arizona mantis, or New Mexico praying mantis, is a species of praying mantis native to North America, most prevalent in the south-western United States. This beneficial insect is green or beige in color and grows up to around 3 inches long.

Behavior
Stagmomantis limbata are attracted to lights, and males often fly to lights in numbers, but females are unable to fly.

Description
S. limbata is one of the largest mantids native to North America, though it is much smaller than some African and Asian mantids such as species in the genera Sphodromantis and Hierodula. The facial plate (below and between antennae) is about twice as wide as it is long, typical of the genus, though the eyes are not as protruding as the Carolina Mantid's. Females are most often fairly plain green (often with a yellowish abdomen), but sometimes gray, or light brown, with dark spot in middle of the tegmina, which do not completely cover the wide abdomen. Hind wings may be checkered or striped yellow.

Males are slender, long-winged, and variable in color, but most often green and brown with the sides of the folded tegmina green and top brownish (may be solid gray, brown, green, or any combination of these). Abdomen without prominent dark spots on top. The wings are transparent, usually with cloudy brownish spots on outer half.

Habitat
Variable, often in open semi-arid areas in tall forbs, shrubs, or trees, but more abundant in lusher, often riparian and wooded areas of streamsides, roadsides, canyons, in towns, etc.

Range
Texas to Southern California, north into Colorado and Utah, south into Mexico.

Additional Images

See also
Arizona Mantis
List of mantis genera and species

References

Mantidae
Mantodea of North America
Insects described in 1835